The St. Louis Cardinals, based in St. Louis, Missouri, are a professional baseball franchise that compete in the National League of Major League Baseball (MLB).  The club employs coaches who support – and report directly to – the manager.  Coaches for various aspects of the game, including pitching, hitting, baserunning and fielding, give instruction to players to assist them in exercising the major disciplines that must be successfully executed to compete at the highest level.   These specialized roles are a relatively new development, as coaches initially did not have specific roles and instead had titles such as "first assistant", "second assistant", etc.  St. Louis Cardinals coaches have played an important role in the team's eleven World Series titles.  Many are retired players who at one time played for the team.  Coaching is often part of the path for Major League managerial hopefuls, as a coach's previous experiences typically include managing and/or coaching at the minor league level.  Charley O'Leary and Heinie Peitz, both former Cardinals players, became the first coaches the Cardinals employed as positions separate from the manager in 1913.

The longest-tenured coach in Cardinals' franchise history is Red Schoendienst, who has filled a variety of roles for the St. Louis Cardinals.  First, he played 15 seasons as a second baseman for the Cardinals before becoming an on-field coach in 1962 in his penultimate season as an active player.  He continued to coach through 1964, and the next season, became the Cardinals' manager.  Returning as an on-field coach for the Cardinals in 1979, Schoendienst remained in that capacity until 1995. From 1996 until his death in 2018, he served as a special assistant to the general manager as a coaching advisor.  In all, Schoendienst coached for St. Louis for 38 total seasons.  He has also worn a St. Louis Major League uniform in eight different decades, won four World Series titles as part of on-field personnel and two more World Series titles since moving into his role as an advisor.

The current longest-tenured coach through 2015 is third-base coach José Oquendo, who has been coaching for the Cardinals since 1999.  The latest addition is assistant hitting coach Bill Mueller, who was hired before the 2015 season.  The longest-tenured on-field coach in franchise history is Buzzy Wares; he is also the only coach for the Cardinals with a consecutive on-field season streak of 20 or more seasons with 23.  Schoendienst is the only other with 20 or more total seasons; he also had a streak of 17 consecutive seasons.  Dave Duncan and Dave McKay are both tied for third with 16 total seasons and both with a streak of 16 consecutive seasons.  Jose Oquendo is also tied with Duncan and McKay with 16 years during the 2015 season as it marks his 16 consecutive season as an on field coach. Others with ten or more seasons include Mike González, Johnny Lewis, Marty Mason, Gaylen Pitts and Dave Ricketts.  Dal Maxvill is the only former Cardinals coach to have become a general manager for the Cardinals.  Ray Blades, Ken Boyer, González, Johnny Keane, Jack Krol, Marty Marion, Bill McKechnie, Schoendienst and Harry Walker have all also managed the Cardinals.  Cardinals coaches who have been elected to the National Baseball Hall of Fame and Museum include Bob Gibson, McKechnie and Schoendienst.

Current coaching staff

 Manager: Oliver Marmol (2017–present)
 Bench: Joe McEwing (2023–present)
 First Base: Stubby Clapp (2019–present)
 Third Base: Ron 'Pop' Warner (2017–present)
 Hitting: Turner Ward (2022–present)
 Assistant Hitting: Brandon Allen (2023–present)
 Assistant Hitting: Daniel Nicolaisen (2023–present)
 Pitching: Dusty Blake (2021–present)
 Assistant Pitching/Bullpen: Julio Rangel (2023–present)
 Bullpen Catcher: Kleininger Teran (2015–present)
 Bullpen Catcher: Jamie Pogue (2012–present)
 Assistant coach: Willie McGee (2018–present)
 Game Planning: Packy Elkins (2020–present)

Lists of coaches

Bench coaches

Hitting coaches

Assistant hitting coaches

Pitching coaches

Bullpen coaches

First base coaches

Third base coaches

Assistant coaches

Unspecified roles

Related lists
 List of St. Louis Cardinals owners and executives
 List of St. Louis Cardinals managers
 List of St. Louis Cardinals seasons

See also
 St. Louis Cardinals Manager and Coaches
Coach (baseball)

References

Source notes

Bibliography
 

Lists of Major League Baseball coaches
Coaches
St. Louis Cardinals coaches